Racine Avenue is a commuter rail station along the Blue Island Branch of the Metra Electric line in the West Pullman neighborhood of Chicago, Illinois.

Racine Avenue is the last station along the Blue Island Branch within the Chicago city limits. Parking is available exclusively along 121st Street between South Elizabeth and South Racine Avenues. No bus connections are available at this station.

A station typology adopted by the Chicago Plan Commission on October 16, 2014, assigns the Racine Avenue station a typology of Mixed Residential/Industrial Neighborhood (MRIN). This typology is an area in which the Metra station serves both residential and industrial uses. Like most of the MRIN stations, it does not have access to CTA rail.

References

External links

Station from Google Maps Street View

Metra stations in Chicago